This list of tunnels in China includes any road, rail or waterway tunnel in China.

Beijing
Xiaoyue Tunnel

Chongqing
Baiyun Tunnel (cross-mountain) (road)

Gansu
Wushaoling Tunnel

Hainan
Qiaozhong Road Tunnel

Hong Kong

Aberdeen Tunnel (cross-mountain) (road)
Airport Express / Tung Chung line (underwater) (metro)
Beacon Hill Tunnel (cross-mountain) (rail/metro)
Cheung Tsing Tunnel (cross-mountain) (road)
Cross-Harbour Tunnel (underwater) (road)
Eagle's Nest Tunnel (cross-mountain) (road)
Eastern Harbour Crossing / Tseung Kwan O line (underwater) (road and metro)
Kai Tak Tunnel (beneath site of former Hong Kong International Airport) (road)
Lion Rock Tunnel (cross-mountain) (road and water pipe)
Sha Tin Heights Tunnel (cross-mountain) (road)
Shing Mun Tunnels (cross-mountain) (road)
Tai Lam Tunnel (cross-mountain) (road)
Tate's Cairn Tunnel (cross-mountain) (road)
Tsuen Wan line (underwater) (metro)
Western Harbour Crossing (underwater) (road)

Shaanxi
Zhongnanshan Tunnel

Shandong
Qing-Huang Tunnel

Shanghai
A20 (Outer Ring Road) Tunnel
Bund Passage
Bund Sightseeing Tunnel
Dalian Road Tunnel
Dapu Road Tunnel
Fuxing East Road Tunnel
Shanghai Metro Tunnels, including 6 crossings of the Huangpu River as of 2010
Shanghai Yangtze River Tunnel and Bridge
Xiangyan Road Tunnel
Yan'an East Road Tunnel
Yangpu Road Tunnel

Sichuan
Mount Erlang Tunnel

Tibet
Fenghuoshan tunnel
Yangbajing tunnel

See also
 List of long railway tunnels in China
List of tunnels by location
 Yangtze River bridges and tunnels

 
Tunnels
China
Tunnels